The 2018 Vuelta a Andalucía was the 64th edition of the Vuelta a Andalucía cycle race and was held on 14 February to 18 February 2018. The race started in Mijas and finished in Barbate. The race was won by Tim Wellens.

Teams
Twenty two teams entered the race. Each team had a maximum of seven riders:

General classification

References

2018
2018 in Spanish road cycling
2018 UCI Europe Tour